Ațintiș  is a commune in Mureș County, Transylvania, Romania. It is composed of six villages: Ațintiș, Botez (Batizháza), Cecălaca (Csekelaka), Iștihaza (Istvánháza), Maldaoci (Madavölgytanya), and Sâniacob (Marosszentjakab).

The commune lies on the Transylvanian Plateau, on the banks of the river Mureș and its left tributary, the river Ațintiș. It is located in the western part of the county,  from the county seat, Târgu Mureș, on the border with Alba County.

As of the 2011 census, Ațintiș had a population of 1,575; of those, 59.2% were Romanians, 32% Hungarians, and 6.7% Roma.

See also
List of Hungarian exonyms (Mureș County)

References

Communes in Mureș County
Localities in Transylvania
Székely communities